Richard S. Cordrey (September 8, 1933 – August 21, 2022) was an American farmer, businessman, and politician.

Cordrey was born and lived in Millsboro, Delaware, with his wife and family, and graduated from the Millsboro High School in 1951. He was a grain and poultry farmer. Cordrey also worked with the family business, the John A. Cordrey Feed Company. Cordrey served in the United States Army and was stationed at Fort Gordon in Georgia. Cordrey also went to the Goldey–Beacom College. Cordrey served on the Millstown Town Council from 1965 to 1973. Cordrey then served in the Delaware House of Representatives from 1971 to 1973 and in the Delaware Senate from 1973 to 1997. He then served as the Delaware Secretary of Finance from 2005 to 2009. He was a Democrat. Cordrey died at his home in Millsboro, Delaware, the city where his funeral and burial took place.

References

|-

|-

|-

1933 births
2022 deaths
People from Millsboro, Delaware
Goldey–Beacom College alumni
Businesspeople from Delaware
Farmers from Delaware
Military personnel from Delaware
Delaware city council members
Democratic Party members of the Delaware House of Representatives
Democratic Party Delaware state senators
State cabinet secretaries of Delaware